Through My Eyes is an album by guitarist Fabrizio Sotti that was released in 2004.

Through My Eyes was recorded and mixed at Condulmer Studios, Italy and Smythe Studios, New York City in July and November 2002, and was engineered by Giorgio Piovan and Stephane Guyot. It was released on Sotti's own Sotti Entertainment label two years later. Dennis D'Amico is credited as a co-producer on the album.

Track listing 
All tracks written by Fabrizio Sotti

 On My Way to You
 Through My Eyes
 Inner Dance
 Release #1
 Release #2
 Remembering
 What if
 While the Sun is Rising
 Improvisation #1
 Introspective
 Goodbye

Personnel 
 Fabrizio Sotti – guitars, producer
 Dennis D'Amico – producer
 Giorgio Piovan and Stephane Guyot – engineers
 Kurt Lundvall – mastering

References 

2004 albums
Fabrizio Sotti albums